Harry O'Brien may refer to:

 Harry J. O'Brien, American football, basketball, and baseball coach
 Héritier Lumumba (born 1986), Australian rules footballer, formerly known as Harry O'Brien